National Waterway 2 (NW-2) is a section of the Brahmaputra River having a length of 891 km between the Bangladesh border near Dhubri and Sadiya in Assam.

History
It was declared as National Waterway No. 2 on 1 September 1988.

Development

Summary
 Established:  September 1988.
 Length: 891 km
 Fixed terminals: Pandu Port.
 Floating terminals:  Dhubri Port, Jogighopa, Tezpur, Silghat, Dibrugarh, Jamuguri, Bogibil, Saikhowa and Sadiya

Navigational aid
To provide the safe navigation for various vessels, day navigation marks with bamboos and navigational lights fixed on country boats/beacons have been provided between the Bangladesh Border and Dibrugarh.

Enhancements
In December 2017, the union minister Nitin Gadkari flagged off 2 barges of 200-tonne capacity each carrying a total of 400 tonnes of cement from the Pandu Port to Dhubri Port for a distance of 255 km, resulting in reduction of 300 km of road travel and logistics costs for this Sagarmala project to connect Northeast India and to enhance movement for the Indian Armed Forces by setting up roll on-roll off services, 4 Global Positioning System (DGPS) stations for safe navigation (Dhubri, Jogighopa, Biswanthghat and Dibrugarh) and 12 floating terminal facilities (Hatsingimari, Dhubri, Jogighopa, Pandu Port, Tezpur, Silghat, Biswanath Ghat, Neamati, Sengajan, Bogibil, Dibrugarh/Oakland and Uriumghat, which will be increased). There are 19 National Waterways for the Northeast connectivity.

Economic impact 
India and Bangladesh plan to use NW2 as part of the larger Eastern Waterways Grid for economic development purposes. 

References

See also
 Inland waterways of India
 Inland Waterways Authority of India
 Pandu Port

External links
 NW II on the website of the Inland Waterways Authority of India

Citations

Waterways in India
Transport in Assam
Transport in Dibrugarh